Notkea Rotta is a Finnish rap group consisting of members Notkea Rotta, Rautaperse (Komisario Jyrkkä), Rohtori Laine and Meno-Anu. The group mixes humour and comedy in their brand of hip hop, crafting original (and largely fictional) rap saga of the underground culture in the east side of Helsinki. Notkea Rotta heavily parodies - or pays tribute to - American gangsta rap.

Notkea Rotta released their debut single "Pohinää" with Karelia Records.

Their lyrical subject matter mostly deals with common Finnish street drugs (especially amphetamine), sex and the occasional clashes with the police. The group raps exclusively in Finnish, using a lot of Helsinki slang vocabulary, making it rather difficult for non-speakers to understand the lyrics.

While the group had a band on stage at live acts for a longer time, on the last album the band was also in the studio for the recording of the 2007 album "Kontula - Koh Phangan All Night Long". The band is called "Liekehtivät Torsionit" (Flaming Torsions) and consists of musicians better known from bands like Barathrum, Ensiferum, L.A.M.F. and Defuse.

Members
Notkea Rotta (literally "Supple Rat")
Rautaperse (literally "Iron Arse") / Komisario Jyrkkä (literally "Inspector Steep")
Meno Anu (literally "Speedy-Anu") (real name Maria Järvenhelmi) 
Rohtori Laine

Liekehtivät Torsionit
The rhythm section of the band is called Liekehtivät Torsionit. 
Pannu Hanhi (Janne Parviainen) – drums
Putsi T (Tero Karjalainen) – bass
Rane Raitsikka (Harri Jäntti) – guitar
Pajulaakso (Jyrki Pajunen) - producer

Discography

Albums
2002: Panokset piippuun, pöhinät pönttöön
2005: Itä Meidän 
2007: Kontula - Koh Phangan All Night Long
2012: Notkea Rotta
Notkea Rotta - solo
2010: Notkea maa 
Rohtori Laine - solo
TBA: Salkku ja mulkku

EPs
2004: Kaupungin vauhdissa EP

Singles
2001: "Pöhinää CDS"

External links
Notkea Rotta (in Finnish)

Finnish musical groups